Keystone Bank Limited, is a commercial bank in Nigeria. The bank is one of the commercial banks licensed by the Central Bank of Nigeria, the national banking regulator.

Overview
Keystone Bank offers banking services to large corporations, public institutions, small to medium enterprises (SMEs) and individuals. The bank is a large financial services provider in Nigeria. , the bank's total assets were valued at US$1.916 billion (NGN:307.5 billion), with shareholders' equity valued at about US$213.3 million (NGN:34.23 billion).

History
On Friday 5 August 2011, Keystone Bank Limited was issued a commercial banking license by the Central Bank of Nigeria (CBN). On the same day, CBN revoked the banking license of Bank PHB. Keystone Bank assumed the assets and some liabilities of the now defunct Bank PHB.

On 22 March 2017, Asset Management Company of Nigeria announced that Keystone bank had been sold to investors for 25 billion naira ($81.5 million). It was sold to Sigma Golf-Riverbank consortium.

Ownership
The bank was previously owned by the Asset Management Corporation of Nigeria (AMCON), an arm of the Federal Government of Nigeria.
The bank is currently owned by Sigma Golf River Bank Consortium after being acquired from the Asset Management Corporation of Nigeria (AMCON) in March 2017.

Keystone Bank Group
The bank together with its onshore and offshore subsidiaries, constitute the Keystone Bank Group. The bank's subsidiaries include the following:

 Global Bank Liberia – Monrovia, Liberia
 Keystone Insurance – Lagos, Nigeria

Branch network
According to its website, the bank maintains a network of over 150 business offices and locations in all the states of Nigeria.

Some of its products offered to the public includes; QuickSave/ QuickSave Plus, Paytime Accounts, Partner Plus, Active Dom/Dom Extra, Growbiz Account, Future Account, NIDA etc.

Governance
After the sale of the bank by AMCON, the bank is now governed by a substantive Board of Directors. The Chairman of the Board of Keystone Bank Limited is Alhaji Umaru H. Modibbo. The managing director and chief executive officer of the bank is Olaniran Olayinka who was appointed in March 2020 shortly after the exit of the acting MD/CEO, Mr. Abubakar Danlami Sule. The current executive directors of the bank include; Messrs Tijjani Aliyu, Adeyemi Odusaya and Lawal Jibrin Ahmed.

See also

 List of banks in Nigeria
 Central Bank of Nigeria
 Economy of Nigeria
 Bank PHB
 Orient Bank

References

Other sources
 </ref>

External links
 Homepage of Keystone Bank Limited
 Website of Central Bank of Nigeria
Federal Government Appoints Leaders of Nationalised Banks
Interview With Oti Ikomi, Managing Director Keystone Bank In 2012
Ikeazor appointed Keystone Bank MD/CEO
Ikeazor resumes as Keystone Bank CEO
Keystone Bank constitutes Transition Board
Keystone Bank Names Acting MD-CEO
Keystone Bank Appoints Olaniran Olayinka

Banks of Nigeria
Banks established in 2011
Companies based in Lagos
Nigerian companies established in 2011